E. Ann Matter (born December 29, 1949) is former Associate Dean for Arts & Letters and Professor of Religious Studies Emerita at the University of Pennsylvania.  She specializes in Medieval Christianity, including mysticism, women and religion, sexuality and religion, manuscript and textual studies, biblical interpretation and sacred music.

Education
Matter was educated at Oberlin College, where she received her B.A. in Religion (1971), and at Yale University, where she received her M.A. (1974), M.Phil. (1975), and Ph.D. (1976) in Religious Studies under the supervision of Jaroslav Pelikan.

In 1976, Matter began to teach at the University of Pennsylvania, where, in 1996, she was elected R. Jean Brownlee Professor of Religious Studies.  In 2005, Matter was appointed William R. Kenan Professor of Religious Studies and in 2006 to the post of Associate Dean for Arts & Letters, with responsibility for all 12 of the University's humanities departments.

In 1992, she received a Guggenheim Fellowship and, in 2003, she was elected Fellow of the Medieval Academy of America.

Books
Matter is the author of
The Voice of My Beloved: The Song of Songs in Western Medieval Christianity, University of Pennsylvania Press, 1990

She is editor or translator of:
Paschasius Radbertus, De partu Virginis, Brepols, 1985
Grazia Deledda, La chiesa della solitudine, 1936, translated as The Church of Solitude, University of New York Press, 2002
Lucy Brocadelli, Una mistica contestata: La Vita di Lucia da Narni (1476-1544) tra agiografia e autobiografia, with Gabriella Zarri, Ed. Storia e Lett., 2011
Alberto Alfieri, Education, Civic Virtue, and Colonialism in Fifteenth-Century Italy: The Ogdoas of Alberto Alfieri, Arizona Center for Medieval and Renaissance Studies, 2011

She is also the editor or co-editor of
Creative Women in Medieval and Early Modern Italy: A Religious and Artistic Renaissance, University of Pennsylvania Press, 1994
The Liturgy of the Medieval Church, Western Michigan University, 2001
Mind Matters: Studies of Medieval and Early Modern Intellectual History in Honour of Marcia Colish, Turnhout, 2009
The New Cambridge History of the Bible, Vol. II: From 600 to 1450, Cambridge University Press, 2012
From Knowledge to Beatitude: St. Victor, Twelfth-century Scholars, and Beyond: Essays in Honor of Grover A. Zinn, Jr, University of Notre Dame Press, 2013

References

1947 births
Living people
Oberlin College alumni
Yale University alumni
American feminists
Fellows of the Medieval Academy of America